(subtitled "Fairy Ring") is the 30th studio album by Japanese singer-songwriter Miyuki Nakajima, released in October 2002. Like some efforts such as Jidai: Time Goes Around, it mainly consists of her compositions which had previously interpreted by other singers, or performed on the series of her musicals Yakai.

Nakajima had a duet with Masashi Sada on "You Reminds Me of...", a song they wrote for Ken Takakura and Nae Yuki in 1994.

Track listing
All songs written by Miyuki Nakajima (unless otherwise noted), arranged by Ichizo Seo.
"" – 4:05
"" – 4:54
"" – 4:57
"" – 4:46
 Medley: ""/"" (Nakajima/Juro Kara) – 5:35
"" (Masashi Sada/Nakajima) – 6:45
 "" – 5:06
"" – 4:00
"" (Tsugutoshi Goto/Nakajima) – 5:40
"" – 6:24
"" – 6:05

Personnel
Miyuki Nakajima – Vocals
Masashi Sada – Vocals
Michael Thompson – Electric guitar, nylon guitar
Masayoshi Furukawa – Electric guitar
Song Rui – Electric guitar
Dean Parks – Mandocello, acoustic guitar, bouzouki, flat mandolin
Tim Pierce – Flat mandolin
Jia Pengfang – Erhu
Neil Stubenhaus – Electric bass
Reggie Hamilton – Bass
Vinnie Colaiuta – Drums
Yūta Saito – Keyboards
Elton Nagata – Keyboards
Jon Gilutin – Keyboards, acoustic piano, electric piano, yangqin, pad
Shingo Kobayashi – Keyboards, drums programming
Ichizo Seo – Keyboards
Yousuke Sugimoto – Synth programming, percussion loop
Keishi Urata – Drums programming, percussion loop, synth programming
Tomo'o Sato – Drums programming, synth programming, acoustic guitar
Yoshiaki Sato – Accordion
Dan Higgins – Tenor sax
Stephanie Bennett – Irish harp
John Clarke – Penny whistle
Julia Waters – Backing vocals
Maxine Waters – Backing vocals
Oren Waters – Backing vocals
Kazuyo Sugimoto – Backing vocals
People of Yamaha Music Foundation – Chorus
Suzie Katayama – Strings conductor
Sid Page – Violin (Concertmaster)
Charlie Bisharat – Violin 
Joel Derouin – Violin 
Norm Hughes – Violin 
Beri Garabedian – Violin 
Peter Kent – Violin 
Susan Chatman – Violin 
John Wittenberg – Violin 
Amen Garabedian – Violin 
Mark Robertson – Violin 
Carole Mukogawa – Viola
Damin MaCamn – Viola
Dan Smith – Cello
Stefanie Fife – Cello
Tomoyuki Asagawa – Harp

Chart positions

Release history

References

Otogibanashi
Otogibanashi
Self-covers albums